The Frigate 36 is a Canadian sailboat, that was designed by C&C Design and first built in 1968. It is named in honour of the Frigate warship class.

The Frigate 36 is a development of the 1966 C&C-designed Invader 36, with a stub long keel and centerboard in place of the fixed long keel and with more sail area.

Production
The design was built by Belleville Marine Yard and also by Hinterhoeller Yachts, both part of C&C Yachts, in Canada. They completed 36 examples of the design starting in 1968, but the design is now out of production.

Design

The Frigate 36 is a small recreational keelboat, built predominantly of fiberglass, with wood trim. It has a masthead sloop rig, a raked stem, a raised reverse transom, a keel-mounted rudder controlled by a wheel tiller and a fixed stub long keel, with a centreboard. It displaces  and carries  of ballast.

The boat was factory-fitted with a Universal Atomic 4 gasoline engine.

See also
List of sailing boat types

Related development
Corvette 31
Invader 36

Similar sailboats
Bayfield 36
Beneteau 361
C&C 36-1
C&C 36R
C&C 110
Catalina 36
Columbia 36
Coronado 35
CS 36
Ericson 36
Hinterhoeller F3
Hunter 36
Hunter 36-2
Hunter 36 Legend
Hunter 36 Vision
Islander 36
Nonsuch 36
Portman 36
S2 11.0
Seidelmann 37
Vancouver 36 (Harris)
Watkins 36
Watkins 36C

References

External links

 Original Factory Brochure - Frigate, 5 page B&W

Keelboats
1960s sailboat type designs
Sailing yachts
Sailboat type designs by C&C Design
Sailboat types built by Hinterhoeller Yachts
Sailboat types built by C&C Yachts